Owen Powell (born 1967) is a Welsh guitarist. He played in the Welsh rock band Catatonia from 1995 until the band disbanded in 2001.

Career

Catatonia
Powell joined Catatonia in 1995 as a second guitarist. He went on to write for the band, including "Strange Glue" and "My Selfish Gene" from International Velvet, and "Nothing Hurts" and "Dazed Beautiful and Bruised" from Equally Cursed and Blessed.

Wawffactor
Following Catatonia's split on 21 September 2001, Powell became a judge on Welsh TV talent show Wawffactor.

The Stand
In 2010, Powell teamed up with actor/Pocket Devils frontman Jonny Owen, Super Furry Animals bassist Guto Pryce and former Funeral For A Friend drummer Ryan Richards to form the supergroup The Stand, to release a fundraising single, a rendition of the Valleys hymn "When the Coal Comes from the Rhondda" entitled "I'll Be There" to raise funds for the Fred Keenor statue outside the Cardiff City Stadium.

References

1967 births
Living people
Musicians from Cardiff
People from Cambridge
Britpop musicians